Iris Renate Dorothea Berben (born 12 August 1950) is a German actress.

Biography

Berben was born in Detmold, North Rhine-Westphalia. She grew up in Hamburg, where her parents ran a restaurant. 

Berben has appeared in about 150 film and television productions since 1969. Until today, Berben plays leading roles in a large number of German television productions, including the sitcom Zwei himmlische Töchter in the 1970s and the comedy show Sketchup with Diether Krebs in the 1980s. One of her best-known roles is the title character, a no-nonsense police commissioner, in the long-running crime series Rosa Roth between 1994 and 2013. Among her film roles are Sergio Corbucci's western Compañeros (1970) with Franco Nero, the Thomas Mann film adaption Die Buddenbrooks (2008) and the barmaid Petra in the sport film Eddie the Eagle (2016).

After the Six-Day War in 1967, she travelled to Israel, and afterwards became the partner of the Israeli singer Abi Ofarim. Since then, she has been associated with the pro-Israel lobby and has campaigned against antisemitism. She had a son, Oliver, in 1971, but never revealed the identity of the father.

In 2010, together with Bruno Ganz, Berben was elected president of the German Film Academy. She served as a SPD delegate to the Federal Convention for the purpose of electing the President of Germany in 2017.

Filmography

 Detectives (1969)
 The Man with the Glass Eye (1969)
 Brandstifter (1969)
  (1970)
 Compañeros (1970)
 Supergirl (1971)
 Das Fräulein von Scuderi (1976)
 Duett zu dritt (1976)
 Derrick – Series 4, Episode 3: "Eine Nacht im Oktober" (1977, TV)
 Zwei himmlische Töchter (1978, TV series)
 Derrick – Series 5, Episode 6: "Klavierkonzert" (1978, TV)
 Ach du lieber Harry (1980)
  (1983)
 Angelo und Luzy (1984, TV series)
  (1984)
  (1984)
 Rallye Paris – Dakar (1984)
 Beinahe Trinidad (1985)
 Sketchup (1985–1986, TV series)
 Das Erbe der Guldenburgs (1986–1990, TV series)
 Tagebuch für einen Mörder (1988, TV film)
  (1988)
  (1989, TV film)
  (1990, TV film)
 The Second Life (1990, TV film)
  (The Frog Prince) (1991)
 Cosimas Lexikon (1992)
  (1992, TV film)
  (1995)
 Rosa Roth (1994–2013, TV series, 31 episodes)
  (1996)
 Code Red (1997, TV film)
  (1998, TV film)
  (1998)
 Am I Beautiful? (1998)
  (1999, TV film)
 Ein mörderischer Plan (2000, TV film)
  (2000, TV film)
  (2001, TV film)
 Wer liebt, hat Recht (2001, TV film)
 666 – Traue keinem, mit dem du schläfst! (2001)
 Fahr zur Hölle, Schwester (2002, TV film)
  (2002, TV film)
  (2004, TV film)
 Die Patriarchin (2005, TV miniseries)
  (2005, TV film)
  (2006, TV film)
 Afrika, mon amour (2007, TV miniseries)
  (2007, TV film)
  (2007, TV film)
  (2008, TV film)
 Die Buddenbrooks (2008)
  (2009, TV miniseries)
  (2009)
  (2011, TV film)
  (2012)
  (2013, TV film)
  (2014)
  (2014, TV film)
 Eddie the Eagle (2015)
  (2016, TV film)
  (2018, TV film)
  (2018)
  (2022)
 Triangle of Sadness (2022)

Audiobooks (excerpt) 
 2005: Françoise Sagan, Bonjour Tristesse. Publisher: Random House Audio Köln, .
 2006: Minka Pradelski, Und da kam Frau Kugelmann. Publisher: Random House Audio Köln, .
 2007: Anna Gmeyner, Manja. Publisher: Hörkultur, .
 2010: Petra Hammesfahr, Die Mutter. Publisher: Random House Audio Köln, gekürzt 4 CDs 296 Min., 
 2011: Marina Lewycka, Kurze Geschichte des Traktors auf Ukrainisch. Publisher: Random House Audio Köln, .
 2011: Iris Berben liest Verbrannte Bücher – Verfemte Komponisten. Publisher: Verlag Herder, .
 2015: Brüder Grimm (Brothers Grimm), Brüderchen und Schwesterchen. Publisher: Amor Verlag, .
 2015: Brüder Grimm (Brothers Grimm),  Frau Holle. Publisher: Amor Verlag, .
 2016: Hans Christian Andersen, Die kleine Meerjungfrau (The Little Mermaid). Publisher: Amor Verlag, .
 2017: David Walliams, Zombie-Zahnarzt, publisher: Argon Verlag, .
 2021: Petra Hammesfahr, Der stille Herr Genardy, publisher: Lübbe Audio, ISBN 978-3-7540-0054-0 (Audiobook-Download)

Awards
 Bundesverdienstkreuz 1997
 Goldene Europa GALA-Sonderpreis 2000
 Scopus Award 2001
 Verdienstorden der Bundesrepublik Deutschland 2003
 Women's World Award – World Tolerance Award 2004
 Bayerischer Verdienstorden 2005
 Karl Valentin Order 2007
 Platinum Romy Award 2018
 Golden Eye Award, Zurich Film Festival 2020

References

External links
  
 
 Laudation on the occasion of the awarding with the Leo-Baeck-Preis 2002 to Iris Berben on 3 September 2002 by Paul Spiegel 
 Iris Berben at the German Dubbing Card Index

1950 births
Living people
Activists against antisemitism
German film actresses
German television actresses
German voice actresses
German Zionists
Officers Crosses of the Order of Merit of the Federal Republic of Germany
Opposition to antisemitism in Germany
People from Detmold
Recipients of the Order of Merit of Berlin
Spaghetti Western actresses
20th-century German actresses
21st-century German actresses